Vidhya Sagar English Secondary School is an educational institution in the 'Kavre' District. It is located in Banepa valley, Sinagal Marga near to the Punyashwor Temple. It was established in 2049 B.S. (1992 A.D.).

Secondary schools in Nepal
Education in Kavrepalanchok District
1992 establishments in Nepal